The 1992 North Dakota gubernatorial election took place on 3 November 1992. Incumbent Democratic-NPL Governor George A. Sinner retired. Republican nominee Ed Schafer defeated Democratic former Attorney General of North Dakota Nicholas Spaeth in a landslide.

Results

References

1992
Gubernatorial
North Dakota